Frederick of Hohenstaufen or Frederick of Staufen may refer to:

Frederick I, Duke of Swabia
Frederick I, Holy Roman Emperor
Frederick II, Duke of Swabia
Frederick II, Holy Roman Emperor
Frederick IV, Duke of Swabia
Frederick V, Duke of Swabia
Frederick of Antioch
Frederick of Pettorano